Protestants probably comprise more than 1% of the population of Qatar, but a minority of 
Christians in Qatar overall. The Protestants were estimated at 1% of the population for 2000 and the Anglicans (being classified otherwise there) at 1.4% for the same year.

A hospital in cooperation with Protestants, in particular one started by American doctor Mary Bruins Allison, was founded in 1947.

Christian religious literature in English is available in bookstores. In 2013 the Qatar Anglican Church of the Epiphany opened, which also accommodates several Evangelical, Pentecostal and other Protestant congregations. 50,000 foreign Christians attend weekly services at the Mesaymeer Religious Complex.
Qatar has some British population. 
Evangelical Churches Alliance Qatar (ECAQ) has approximately 1,200 members who hail primarily from the Philippines, Nigeria, Kenya, India, Indonesia and Malaysia.

Denominations
 Episcopal Church in Jerusalem and the Middle East, a province of the Anglican Communion
 Diocese of Cyprus and the Gulf, the Anglican diocese in which Qatar is located
 Christian Brethren and other free churches
 Presbyterianism
 Church of South India
 Arab Evangelical Church
 Pentecostals
 Lutheranism
 Charismatic movement
 Redeemed Christian Church of God

Qatar has granted legal status to Anglican and Filipino Evangelical and Indian Christian churches.
Denominations are registered under the aegis of the Anglican Church.
90 house churches allocated to members of the Evangelical Church Alliance in Qatar exist.

Languages of worship
Arabic
English
German
Hindi
Igbo
Indonesian
Kannada
Malayalam
Nepali
Punjabi
Portuguese
Sinhala
Swahili
Tagalog
Tamil
Telugu

Public Gatherings 

An open air public gathering, where about 12,000 people gathered at the Asian Town Amphitheater Stadium for the Don Moen concert - festival of peace in November 30 & December 1, 2018. It was organized by Route 58:12, a group of individuals from various church backgrounds.

Other wider visibility gatherings;

 Hillsong London concert on December 10, 2016, about 10,000 people gathered at Asian Town Amphitheater Stadium organized by Route 58:12.
 Planetshakers concert in May 2017 about 4,000 people gathered at Ali Bin Hamad al-Attiyah Arena organized by Route 58:12.

See also 
 Catholic Church in Qatar
 Protestantism by country

References

 
Qatar